Norman Stark Paul (March 23, 1919 – March 30, 1978) was United States Assistant Secretary of Defense for Legislative Affairs from January 25, 1961 to June 30, 1962; Assistant Secretary of Defense for Force Management Policy from August 8, 1962 to September 30, 1965; and United States Under Secretary of the Air Force from October 1965 to September 1967.  He died of cancer in Washington, D.C. on May 30, 1978 at the age of 59.

Paul was a member of the Yale College Class of 1940.

References

1978 deaths
1919 births
United States Assistant Secretaries of Defense
Yale University alumni